is a Japanese former gymnast who competed in the 1976 Summer Olympics.

References

1953 births
Living people
Japanese male artistic gymnasts
Olympic gymnasts of Japan
Gymnasts at the 1976 Summer Olympics
Olympic gold medalists for Japan
Olympic bronze medalists for Japan
Olympic medalists in gymnastics
Medalists at the World Artistic Gymnastics Championships
Universiade medalists in gymnastics
Universiade gold medalists for Japan
Medalists at the 1976 Summer Olympics
Medalists at the 1977 Summer Universiade
20th-century Japanese people
21st-century Japanese people